, abbreviated as  and , and also known as My Teen Romantic Comedy SNAFU, is a Japanese light novel series written by Wataru Watari and illustrated by Ponkan8. The series follows Hachiman Hikigaya, a pessimistic, closeminded, and realistic teen, who is forced by his teacher to join the school's service club and work with two girls with issues of their own. They offer help and advice to others while dealing with their inner conflicts.

There are three manga adaptations and two anthology volumes. It has been adapted into an anime television series, which aired between April and June 2013 and was followed by a second season which aired between April and June 2015, as well as a third and final season which aired between July and September 2020. Yahari Game demo Ore no Seishun Rabukome wa Machigatteiru, a video game was released by 5pb., for the PlayStation Vita was released in September 2013. A second video game also by 5pb was released in October 2016. Both games were bundled together in a release for the PlayStation 4, titled Yahari Game demo Ore no Seishun Rabukome wa Machigatteiru. & Zoku Omatome Set, which was released in October 2017.

Plot
The story follows two loners, the pragmatic Hachiman Hikigaya and beautiful Yukino Yukinoshita, who despite their varying personalities and ideals, offers help and advice to others as part of their school's Service Club, assisted by the cheerful and friendly Yui Yuigahama. It largely depicts various social situations faced by teens in a high school setting and the psychology driving their interactions.

Characters

Main characters
The main characters in the series are members of the school's service club, which is supervised by Shizuka Hiratsuka.

 The viewpoint character of the light novels, Hachiman is a student in class 2F of Sōbu High School who has been discriminated in the past to the point that he becomes isolated, friendless, and pragmatic to a fault. His most prominent feature is his set of "dead fish-eyes" that puts people off. Due to years of social isolation, he has developed a habit of observing people in his surroundings from a distance, earning him a skill for social perception, figuring out the true nature of people. He believes that youth is an illusion created by hypocrites, for hypocrites, born from his past failures. His experience leads him to believe the happiness of others is a facade. He is affectionately called "Hikki" by Yui. Hayato's clique wrongly address him as "Hikitani".
 His teacher Shizuka worries about him becoming a social outcast and forces him to join the Service Club. Hachiman believes himself to be an insignificant entity and is willing to take the blame in order to keep everyone else happy.
 On the first day of high school, he winds up in a car accident from trying to save Yui's puppy and ends up in the hospital for three weeks, making him an outsider once he gets back because the whole class has already formed its cliques. He thinks that Yui's feelings for him are due to guilt and thus, indirectly rejects Yui, thinking he would cause trouble for her. He also distances himself from Yukino after realizing that the car that rammed into him belongs to her family. In both cases, they make amends with him once said misunderstandings are cleared. It is suggested that he is aware of the girl's feelings, due to studying people's behavior and doesn't accept them as genuine, but eventually confesses to Yukino after being honest with his own feelings.

 Yukino is a student in class 2J and the president of the Service Club, she was the sole member until Hachiman joined. Born to a wealthy family, she is smart, beautiful, and nicknamed the "Ice-cold Beauty" for her icy demeanour. She shows no empathy and little kindness towards Hachiman at first, but eventually opens up to him. Due to her talent and beauty, she is envied by most girls and is disgusted by their attitude to undermine her instead of improving themselves, thus she has few friends. She has a twisted sense of noblesse oblige, and believes it is the duty of the exceptional to help the "lost lambs" of the world. She essentially wants to help others, but is brutally honest and directly analyses their flaws. Her personality often leads her to be disgusted at the naiveté and lack of understanding how things work of others, particularly Yui's, and she does not hesitate to show it. Despite this, Yui still affectionately refers to her as "Yukinon"; thanks to her, Yukino becomes kinder and the two girls become best friends. She recognizes Hachiman from the car accident but lies about it when Hachiman joins the Service Club. She is devastated when he distances himself from her, after learning it from her sister. Throughout the series, she develops feelings for him, accepts Hachiman's confession to her, and become his girlfriend in the end.

 Yui is Hachiman's classmate. A cheerful, outgoing girl, she becomes the Service Club's first "customer," asking them to help her bake cookies for "a certain someone." By no means cynical and the friendliest member of the group, her problems lie not with her personality, but with her inability to express herself due to fear of losing friends, and thus admires Yukino and Hachiman, who are able to express their true feelings. She believes that talent is inborn, and often aspires to be like others until Yukino changes her way of thinking. Following her experience with the Service Club, Yui begins to attend Service Club sessions after school as well, despite Yukino's objections early on. In class, Yui is a member of Hayato's clique but has no say in matters as she is often overwhelmed by Yumiko. She has been holding feelings towards Hachiman ever since he saved her dog on the first day of high school. Upon learning Hachiman is in love with Yukino, Yui decided to give up her feelings toward Hachiman and decided support them. She is later able confess her feeling to him, but is rejected by him. However, she continues to harbor feelings for him even as Hachiman and Yukino grow closer as a couple, with her feelings being validated by Iroha and Komachi.

 Iroha is a first-year student who manages the football team, is cheerful and pretty. As she was recommended as a candidate for the student council president in a prank, out of her dislike of the role, she filed a request to the Service Club in order to not get elected and yet not lose in an embarrassing fashion. She eventually accepts her role of being the student council president after Hachiman managed to convince her. There is a running joke where Iroha mistakes something that Hachiman says or does as flirting, and promptly rejects him.

Class 2F

 Saika is the president of the tennis club who has an androgynous appearance but prefers others to not mistake his gender. He is called "The Prince" by his female classmates. On their first meeting, Saika asks help from Hachiman to join the tennis club, which was brushed off by Yukino. Saika then asked the Service Club to help him improve his tennis skills. He eventually became one of the few people in class 2F who would talk to Hachiman on a first name basis, and often hangs out with him. Despite knowing that Saika is a boy, Hachiman oftentimes finds himself unwillingly attracted to him.

 Hayato is Yukino's childhood friend who is a central figure in class 2F and the ace of the football club. He is extremely kind to other people, including Hachiman, and often offers his help to others. However, Hayama claims that he can never forge a good relationship with Hachiman since, despite understanding his acts of social suicide to protect everyone, he does not agree with him. He and Yukino have some strain to their relationship, stemming from an incident in the past, and thus far, his attempts to mend his relationship with Yukino have failed. Despite his popularity and success, he feels largely inferior to Hachiman.

 Yumiko is a popular girl from class 2F with a pompous personality. She is the main female figure in Hayato's clique and it is hinted that she has feelings for Hayato. Due to her popularity, she has no trouble making friends, but she has little to no understanding towards people who have social troubles. 

.
A close friend of Yumiko and Yui's, and a member of Hayato's clique. A massive Yaoi fangirl who loves to see two boys hitting on each other. When she gets riled up, all respect for personal space of others goes out the window. She has an eye for detail, especially for clothing.

 Saki is Hachiman's classmate who seems like a delinquent but wants to make friends deep down. She cares deeply for her brother as she hid her name and age to work as a night-shift bartender in order to pay school fees and reduce her family's load. After her brother asked for the Service Club's help, they eventually followed Saki to her workplace and found out her motives behind working night-shifts; she stopped working after the Service Club suggested her to aim for a scholarship instead.

 Tobe is a member of Hayato's clique who is in the football club. He has feelings for Hina and is the only guy in the class who supported Hina's script for the cultural festival. During the school excursion, he intended to confess to Hina and therefore requested help from the Service Club. However, Hachiman knew Hina did not want to get into a relationship, so he confesses to (and is rejected by) Hina to prevent Tobe from being rejected, thus maintaining the status quo within that group. 

 Yamato is a member of Hayato's clique who is in the rugby club.

 Ōoka is a member of Hayato's clique who is in the baseball club.

 Minami is the leader of the second most influential clique in class 2F and holds a grudge towards Yui, who she was friendly with during their first high school year, for being in the superior clique. She volunteered to be event organizer for the cultural festival in order to promote her worth without the actual ability to do such a job, and thus requested help from the Service Club. As such, Yukino took up the role of an assistant event organizer and claimed the spotlight in making the cultural festival a successful one, which in turn made Minami depressed about her own uselessness and refused to host the closing ceremony. However, as Hachiman's fierce scolding has successfully turned himself into the scapegoat and shifted the blame away from Minami, she attended the closing ceremony and ended the cultural festival on a high note.

Others

 Shizuka is Hachiman's teacher, a language teacher who serves as his futures advisor/ counselor and the consultant for the service club. She is aware of Hachiman's supposed "problems", and takes steps to ensure he is freed from them, her first move being to force him into joining the Service Club. However, she appears to have some quirks of her own: she is a young smoker, she is very sensitive about her age and single status, and she is often prone to quoting or copying scenes from popular shōnen manga. Additionally, she never remembers to knock before entering the Service Club's classroom, much to Yukino's chagrin. After the cultural festival incident, she tells Hachiman that helping others should not be a reason for Hachiman to hurt himself, as there are others who would feel pain seeing Hachiman hurt.

 Komachi is Hachiman's younger sister who, different from her brother, is cheerful and lively, and is a member of the student council in her school. She understands her brother's anti-social personality, cares for, and relies on him. While attached to her brother, she shows cleverness in trying to pair up Hachiman with Yukino or Yui.

 Haruno is Yukino's elder sister. Unlike Yukino, she shows a good attitude towards other people at first but eventually shows a sinister personality. Despite being a college student she spends a good deal of time spying on her sister's life. Yukino holds strong animosity towards her and Haruno can only say her sister constantly tries to overtake her as cute. Nonetheless, Haruno eventually shows her own grudges against Yukino and makes Yukino and Hachiman feel bad in the 2nd season.
 She is a former student of Sōbu High School. She acknowledges Hachiman's perceptiveness and often playfully teases him.
 Her being beautiful, rich, and charismatic makes people only see her good side, defer to her and ignore big problems she causes to others. For instance, in the 1st season, Haruno appears suddenly to abruptly intervene with the Cultural Festival where her role becomes to encourage the President to take it easy, resulting in delayed tasks. Hachiman takes part in picking up the slack and assumes his usual blame-taking role by complaining for the sake of others, complaints that only get him criticized, leading him to a dramatic confrontation with the Festival President. This leading a confrotation with Yui because she knew Haruno trying ruining Yukino life. Yui later treathening her if she ever messing with both Hachiman and Yukino again. Yui will be forbidding Haruno seeing them ever again.

 Yoshiteru is a student from class 2C who suffers from adolescent delusions. He sees Hachiman as a friend after being paired up with him during physical education lessons. While he is annoying, he has a group of otaku friends he's on good terms with. He aims to be a light novel writer.

 Rumi is a lonely primary school student who is openly despised by her peers. Hayato at first tried to resolve the situation through talking to her in front of her classmates, which instead attracted more hateful attention to her. Hachiman and company decided that the only way out is to destroy the trust between her peers, through having Hayato and Kakeru acting as bullies threatening Rumi's group-mates during treasure hunt. However, Rumi was able to use her camera's flash as a distraction, allowing the group to escape. 

 Meguri is a third-year student and the former president of Sōbu High School's student council. Although she is not a reliable leader herself, her personality has brought her immense support from the councillors and thus she is able to unite the student council.

 Taishi is Saki's little brother and Komachi's classmate. He is on good terms with Komachi and is worried about Saki coming home late every night.

 Kaori is Hachiman's classmate in middle school, whom he confessed to in the past. She attends Kaihin General High School.

Chika is Kaori's friend and schoolmate at Kaihin General. She is interested in Hayato.

Tamanawa is Kaihin High School's student council president.
 Mrs. Yukinoshita

 She is Haruno and Yukino's mother. She worries for Yukino's whereabouts living alone and has Haruno spy on her. She is disappointed when she runs into Yukino late at night after a student council event.
 Mrs. Yuigahama

 She is Yui's mother and has a close mother-daughter relationship with Yui, one which Yukino is envious of.

Media

Light novels
The light novel series is written by Wataru Watari and illustrated by Ponkan8. It was published by Shogakukan under their Gagaga Bunko imprint. The first volume was published on March 18, 2011, and the series was concluded with its 14th volume released on November 19, 2019. 

Volumes 3, 4, 7, and 8 were published simultaneously with limited special editions. The special editions of the 3rd and 7th volumes were bundled with drama CDs and those of the 4th and 8th volumes – with art books by Ponkan8 and guest illustrators. A set of the first 7 volumes was released on March 19, 2013. A collection of short stories, volume 7.5, was published on August 20, 2013. Three additional short volumes, 6.25, 6.50 and 6.75 were bundled with the limited editions of the 1st, 3rd and 5th DVD and BD volumes respectively of the first anime series, and were released as single volume, numbered 6.5, on July 22, 2014. A limited special edition of it was bundled with a drama CD. Another short story collection volume, labeled 10.5, was released on March 18, 2015, and a fourth one, 14.5, on April 20, 2021.

Yen Press licensed the series for English release and published it from September 27, 2016, to October 18, 2022.

Drama CDs
A drama CD, titled , was released with a special edition of the 3rd light novel on November 18, 2011. The drama CD contains a character song, sung by Saori Hayami and Nao Tōyama, titled "Bright Generation" and composed by Yukari Hashimoto. A second drama CD, titled , was sold together with the first one at Marvelous AQL's booth at Comiket 83, held on December 29, 30, and 31, 2012. A third drama CD, titled , was bundled with the special edition of the 7th volume, published on March 19, 2013. The drama CD contains a character song by Hayami and Tōyama, titled "Rock You!!" and composed and arranged by Yūya Saitō. A fourth drama CD, titled , was released with the special edition of volume 6.5 on July 22, 2014. The fourth drama CD contains a character song by Hayami and Tōyama, titled .

Manga
The first manga adaptation is illustrated by Rechi Kazuki and published by Square Enix under the title . Its serialization began in the magazine Big Gangan on September 25, 2012. As of November 25, 2022, there have been twenty-one tankōbon published. 

A second series, illustrated by Naomichi Io and titled  was serialized in Shogakukan's Monthly Sunday Gene-X magazine from December 19, 2012, to January 19, 2023. Its chapters have been collected into twenty-one tankōbon volumes so far, with the first published on May 17, 2013. Yen Press licensed the series for English release.

A 4-panel manga series by Yūta Taneda was published by Ichijinsha under the title . A preview chapter was published in the May 2013 issue of the Manga 4-koma Palette magazine, released on March 22, 2013, and the first chapter – in the June 2013 issue, on April 22, 2013. A tankōbon volume of it was released on June 21, 2014. It ended on Jun 22, 2015 and was collected in two volumes. An anthology volume by several authors was published by Ichijinsha under their DNA Media Comics imprint on May 25, 2013, and a second one, on July 25, 2013.

My Youth Romantic Comedy Is Wrong, as I Expected -Monologue- volumes

My Youth Romantic Comedy Is Wrong, as I Expected @comic volumes

Anime

A 13-episode anime television series, directed by Ai Yoshimura and produced by Brain's Base, aired between April 5 and June 21, 2013, with an additional anime-original episode with writing by Wataru Watari following the series on June 27, 2013. The series was simulcast with English subtitles by Crunchyroll. An OVA episode on Blu-ray Disc was bundled with the limited edition of the video game, released on September 19, 2013. The anime has been licensed by Sentai Filmworks in North America and Madman Entertainment in Australia and New Zealand.

A second season was announced by Shogakukan in 2014. The season, titled "Yahari Ore no Seishun Love Come wa Machigatteiru. Zoku", is produced by Feel and directed by Kei Oikawa, with character designs by Yuichi Tanaka and series composition by Shōtarō Suga. It aired between April 3 and June 26, 2015. The second season has been licensed by Sentai Filmworks. An OVA episode, titled , is bundled with the limited edition of the second video game, which was released on October 27, 2016.

A third and final season was announced by Shogakukan on March 18, 2019. Feel returned to animate the third season, with Kei Oikawa returning as director, Keiichirō Ōchi replacing Shōtarō Suga as series composer, and Yuichi Tanaka returning as character designer. The season, titled "Yahari Ore no Seishun Love Come wa Machigatteiru. Kan", was set to premiere on April 9, 2020, before the series was delayed due to the COVID-19 pandemic. The third season aired from July 9 to September 24, 2020. The opening theme is "Megumi no Ame" (芽ぐみの雨) by Yanagi, and the ending theme is "Diamond no Jundo" (ダイヤモンドの純度) by Yukino Yukinoshita (Hayami) and Yui Yuigahama (Tōyama). Sentai Filmworks licensed the third season globally excluding Asia. In Southeast Asia, the series is licensed by Medialink and released on streaming service iQIYI. The third season ran for 12 episodes. A new OVA episode will be bundled with the latest game of the franchise.

On April 2, 2019, Sentai Filmworks confirmed on Twitter that the series would receive a dub; on July 5 of the same year, Sentai announced that both the first and second seasons would be dubbed. 

After Crunchyroll was acquired by Sony Pictures Television and Aniplex, the parent company of Funimation in 2021, My Teen Romantic Comedy SNAFU, among several Sentai titles, was dropped from the service on March 31, 2022.

Video games
A video game for PlayStation Vita, titled  was published by 5pb. and released on September 19, 2013. Takuya Eguchi, Saori Hayami, and Nao Tōyama reprised their roles from the anime. The limited edition was bundled with an OVA episode. 5pb. developed a second video game for the series for the PlayStation Vita that adapted the second season of the anime television series. It was released on October 27, 2016. Like the first game, the limited edition was bundled with an OVA episode. The release date of the second game was postponed from July 28, 2016 to October 27, 2016 on June 14, 2016. Both games were later released in a bundle for the PlayStation 4 on October 26, 2017. A port for the Nintendo Switch was released on September 22, 2022. A third game, adapting the third season of the anime television series, has been announced by 5pb.; it will be bundled with an OVA episode, adapting part of the bonus light novels included with the Blu-ray release of the third season. It is set to be released in Japan for PlayStation 4 and Nintendo Switch on April 27, 2023.

Reception
My Youth Romantic Comedy Is Wrong, as I Expected was chosen as the best light novel of Japan according to the online polls compiled by the Kono Light Novel ga Sugoi! annual guide book in 2014, 2015 and 2016. Hachiman Hikigaya was elected the best male character in 2014, 2015 and 2016, Yukino Yukinoshita was elected the best female character in 2015 and Ponkan8, the series' artist, was chosen as the best illustrator in 2015 and 2016.

References

External links
 Light novel official website 
 Anime official website 
 Video game official website 
 

2011 Japanese novels
2012 manga
2013 anime television series debuts
2015 anime television series debuts
Anime and manga based on light novels
Bandai Namco franchises
Brain's Base
Feel (animation studio)
Gagaga Bunko
Gangan Comics manga
Ichijinsha manga
Light novels
Madman Entertainment anime
Medialink
NBCUniversal Entertainment Japan franchises
Romantic comedy anime and manga
School life in anime and manga
Seinen manga
Sentai Filmworks
Shogakukan franchises
Shogakukan manga
Slice of life anime and manga
Television shows based on light novels
TBS Television (Japan) original programming
Yen Press titles